St. Mary's Hospital is a private, non-for-profit hospital in the west end of Richmond, Virginia. It is a 391-bed hospital and serves the Central Virginia community and beyond.  St. Mary's is affiliated with the Bon Secours Richmond Health System and the Sisters of Bon Secours.

History
Under the guidance of the Sisters of Bon Secours, St. Mary's opened its doors in 1966.  Over the years, the hospital expanded to help serve the community, growing from an initial size of 169 beds and only 250 employees.  Today, St. Mary's has evolved into a state-of-the-art 391-bed facility.  The hospital continues to serve the community with the philosophy of good help to those in need, especially the poor and dying.

Honors and awards
St. Mary's has received a variety of awards for its quality of care.  Highlights include being the first community hospital in Richmond to achieve Magnet Recognition by the American Nurses Credentialing Center for nursing excellence, in 2008.  St. Mary's was named a Top 50 Cardiovascular Hospital in the nation by Thomson Reuters and was recognized by HealthGrades for being ranked among the Top 5% in the nation for emergency medicine, critical care, stroke, gastrointestinal care, and prostatectomy.  St. Mary's was also awarded the HealthGrades 2012 Patient Safety Award.

Services
St. Mary's offers a number of specialized services to the Richmond community.  The hospital is accredited by The Joint Commission for having centers of excellence in heart failure, heart attack, and hip and knee joint replacement, and for its primary stroke center. It's also a center of excellence for surgical weight loss surgery and breast imaging.  Additionally, St. Mary's has been designated as a Comprehensive Cancer Center by the American College of Surgeons.

St. Mary's is well known in Richmond for its birthing center, with Style Magazine readers voting it the "Best Place in Richmond to Have a Baby."  In addition, the hospital has introduced a Pediatric Emergency Department to better serve the community.  In 2014, the Evelyn D. Reinhart Guest House was opened to help serve patients and caregivers who live far from the hospital. The Guest House was built largely thanks to donations and is located within walking distance of St. Mary's.  Patients and caregivers who live far away from the hospital are referred and stay in this "home away from home" to help begin the healing process.

References

External links
St. Mary's Hospital official site
Evelyn D. Reinhart Guest House

Bon Secours Sisters
Hospital buildings completed in 1966
Hospitals in Virginia
Healthcare in Richmond, Virginia
Buildings and structures in Richmond, Virginia
Catholic hospitals in North America
1966 establishments in Virginia